Pathey Holo Deri is a 1957 Bengali film directed by Agradoot. The film has been music composed by Robin Chatterjee. The film starring Uttam Kumar, and Suchitra Sen who was in leading role and others artists like Shishir Batabyal, Anil Bhattacharya, Mihir Bhattacharya, Chhabi Biswas, Bharati Devi, Chandrabati Devi, Jahar Ganguli, Anup Kumar, Shyam Laha, Gopal Majumdar, Chitra Mandal, Sova Sen, Kamala Mukherjee in the supporting roles. This is the first ever color Bengali film in history.

The story of the film revolves around an MBBS doctor who falls in love with the granddaughter of a wealthy man. The young lady helps him to pursue his dream to complete higher studies by giving him her mother's jewellery. After the return of the doctor, the fate of the couple takes a twisting turn as the grandfather of the girl goes for a sinister move.

With their sheer charisma and chemistry, Uttam-Suchitra used to beat any other on-screen couple hollow. Their classic romantic films together are a treat to watch even today and ‘Pathey Holo Deri’ seems to be no exception.

Plot 
The story follows Jayanta, a poor doctor, who falls in love with Mallika, the granddaughter of a wealthy man. Mallika helps Jayanta by giving him her mother's jewellery in order to fund his study of medicine in Europe. However, her grandfather, who is against their relationship, creates misunderstandings between the two and plans to wed Mallika off to another man. Things change when Jayanta comes back to find Mallika in a psychotic vegetative state resulting out of the anxiety and depression of being estranged from him. He sets out on a mission to devote all his life to cure her.

Cast
 Uttam Kumar as Jayanta
 Suchitra Sen as Mallika
 Shishir Batabyal
 Anil Bhattacharya
 Mihir Bhattacharya
 Chhabi Biswas
 Bharati Devi
 Chandrabati Devi
 Jahar Ganguli
 Anup Kumar
 Shyam Laha
 Gopal Majumdar
 Chitra Mandal 
 Sova Sen
 Kamala Mukherjee

Soundtrack
The song is become very popular and so famous even today.

References

External links
 
 Pathey Holo Deri at The Times of India

Bengali-language Indian films
1957 films
Films scored by Robin Chatterjee
1950s Bengali-language films